The Hatboro-Horsham School District is located in Montgomery County in the U.S. state of Pennsylvania. It is a suburban Philadelphia school district of approximately 5000 students. The district operates four elementary schools (K-5), one Middle School (6-8)  and one high school (9-12) in Horsham Township and the borough of Hatboro.

The Superintendent is Dr. Scott Eveslage. The Assistant Superintendent is Dr. Monica J. Taylor.

Schools

Note: Based on the District website December 2020.

References

External links

 

School districts in Montgomery County, Pennsylvania